Christos Vasiliou (born 18 August 1961) is a retired Greek football defender and later manager.

References

1961 births
Living people
Greek footballers
Panetolikos F.C. players
Panathinaikos F.C. players
OFI Crete F.C. players
Apollon Smyrnis F.C. players
Association football defenders
Greece international footballers
Greek football managers
Panetolikos F.C. managers
Platanias F.C. managers
Episkopi F.C. managers
Footballers from Agrinio